Francis Xavier Truong Buu Diep (Vietnamese: Cha Phanxicô Trương Bửu Diệp or Cha Diệp, January 1, 1897 - March 12, 1946) was a Vietnamese Catholic priest who served the people of Bạc Liêu Province.

History 
Born on January 1, 1897, in An Giang Province, Diep was ordained in 1924 after completing his studies at Phnom Penh Major Seminary in Cambodia.

Upon his return to Vietnam, Diep taught at a local seminary and served as a pastor of Tac Say parish for 16 years. He also founded many parishes in Cambodia and Vietnam.

Father Diệp was arrested and killed in 1946 by two of three Japanese soldiers who, after the 1945 surrender of Japan, had defected to Cao Đài general Cao Trường Phát. Earlier, father Diệp had helped the local church reclaim illegally occupied lands and earned the hatred of Boss Cận, the occupier. Boss Cận went to general Phát and accused father Diệp of colluding with the French who would exterminate the Cao Đài. General Phát's two Japanese subordinates and other Cao Đài soldiers imprisoned the Christians in a barn and plotted to burn them all alive, yet father Diệp offered himself to be killed alone so other Christians could live; so the Japanese murdered him and threw his naked, mutilated body into a shallow pool. Father Diệp's body was later drawn out and buried. Shocked by the Japanese's murderous inclination, General Phát later had all three Japanese killed.

Canonization
In 2012, investigation was made to prepare for the canonization of Father Diep.

On October 31, 2014, the Congregation for the Doctrine of the Faith issued a nihil obstat statement approving the process for Father Diep's canonization.

Memorial
On March 12, 2016, Can Tho Diocese held the 70th anniversary of Father Diep's death. The event was attended by a large number of bishops - including Bishop of Can Tho Diocese, Stêphanô Tri Bửu Thiên; Bishop of Da Lat Diocese, Antôn Vũ Huy Chương; Bishop of My Tho Diocese, Phêrô Nguyễn Văn Khảm; and Bishop of Da Nang Diocese, Giuse Châu Ngọc Tri.

Legacy 
Referred to as Father Diep, he is venerated by devotees and even non-Christians in the Mekong Delta. His shrine in Bạc Liêu is a pilgrimage destination. Some report that they were healed after praying for his intercession and visiting his shrine.

Although Catholic, because of his supposed supernatural powers, he is also worshipped by people of folk religions, sometimes alongside non-Christian indigenous Vietnamese divinities.

References 

20th-century Vietnamese Roman Catholic priests
1946 deaths
1897 births
People from An Giang Province
Folk saints
Vietnamese Servants of God